Club Deportivo Nacional is a Mexican football team founded in Guadalajara, Jalisco, México in 1916. The club won its first title in 1922, playing in the second division. It also won seven Liga Amateurs de Jalisco between the 1925–1926 and 1938–1939 seasons, which is the second most years won by a team, behind C.D. Guadalajara, who have won 13. The club has played in the most important leagues in the country and currently plays in the Liga TDP.

History

Amateur era 
The club's origins date back to 1915 in the barrio (neighborhood) of Mexicaltzingo in the city of Guadalajara, Jalisco when Club Unico split into two clubs. It joined the Liga de Jalisco second division in 1919 where they played until 1922 when they won and were allowed to join the league's first division. However, the league made it difficult for the club to join and made them play an exhibition match to prove they were worthiness to play in the first division. Once allowed in, the club went on to win seven titles in 1925–1926, 1926–1927, 1930–1931, 1931–1932, 1933–1934, 1936–1937 and 1938–1939, which puts them behind only C.D. Guadalajara, who won 13.

1924–25 title match 
In the 1923–24 tournament the club finished second in the league thanks to Alfonso Ávila, Lorenzo Camarena, Rafael Fierro, Juan Valencia, Manuel Benavides, Simón García, Juan Vázquez, Teófilo Zúñiga, Luis Valencia, Miguel Alatorre, and Daniel Gómez, along with Isabel Huerta, Francisco Espinosa, Francisco Fierro and Hilario López.

After the tournament ended, the club made its first appearance in Mexico City where they played a friendly series with Real Club España, which they lost. Later, Club Deportivo Nacional went on to play another friendly cup series against local club Club Alianza, this time winning and taking home the Copa Latino-Nacional.

In the 1924–25 tournament, the club finished tied with C.D. Guadalajara, so a championship match was organized which took place on 5 April 1925. The Estadio Felipe Martínez Sandoval was filled to capacity, causing a disturbance due to the number of supporters both inside and outside the stadium. It led to the soldiers shooting warning shots into the sky to try to keep order.

The first goal was scored by Anastasio Prieto from C.D. Guadalajara. In the second half, Zuavo from Nacional scored the equalizer. Close to the end of the game a penalty was called in favor of C.D. Guadalajara, which Nacional protested and some players, in their rage, decided to leave the field. The referee decided that the game must continue regardless. Back-up goalkeeper Francisco Fierros did not leave and so the penalty was executed by Anastasio Prieto, who had scored the first goal for C.D. Guadalajara. This time he was not as fortunate, and his penalty was blocked. The players who had exited decided to return to the game, and a few minutes later the referee called full-time. The draw would have given El Nacional the title, which players from C.D. Guadalajara protested, claiming that the goalkeeper who had blocked the penalty was not a legal player as no substitution had been made. The referee decided to take this to the league's federation, who decided that the game should be played again. So the game was replayed on 20 April that same year. The first half finished with no goals scored. In the second half a penalty was called for El Nacional. The penalty was missed after the ball hit the goal post and so the game remained 0–0. At the end of the game, a long pass was made from the C.D. Guadalajara goalkeeper to Higinio "El Perico" Huerta who, in one swift move, headed the ball and scored the only goal giving C.D. Guadalajara the title. With this, the league's first rivalry was born.

The line-ups for the clubs were as follows:
 C.D. Guadalajara: F. Prieto, D. Huerta, Arias, J. Aceves, G. Prieto, Pellat, Aceves, A. Prieto, Carranza, González, H. Huerta.
 El Nacional: A. Ávila, L. Camarena, R. Fierros, Benavides, López, García, Zúñiga, Valencia, Alatorre, D. Gómez, J. Vázquez.

1925–26 first title 
In the 1925–26 tournament, after having lost the match against C.D. Guadalajara the year prior, the club reinforced its squad by signing new players: Aurelio "Mortero" Delgado, Lorenzo González, José María Chávez and Antonio Casillas. The club managed to win its first title after beating F.C. Atlas in May 1926 with a score of 3–2. For that match, the Nacional supporters once again filled the stadium to capacity, but there were not as many incidents as the year before. The club finished with 17 points, two more than the runner-up C.D. Guadalajara; F.C. Atlas finished with 13. Club Deportivo Nacional did not lose any games during the tournament.

1930s championships

Copa Aviación 
In 1928, with the inauguration of Campo de Aviación a series was organized with Selección Jalisco, who represented the league from Jalisco, against Guerra y Marina from Mexico City. There were players from El Nacional in both clubs. Hilario López was playing for Guerra y Marina. The trophy was donated by then-Mexican president Lázaro Cárdenas. Selección Jalisco won and took that trophy, which later was giving to El Nacional in 1930–31 after the club won the first division league title as well as the third division inferior league.

League titles 
After star player Lorenzo Camarena followed in the footsteps of Hilario López and left the club to join Mexico City's Guerra y Marina, the club brought in new players José "Carbonero" Sánchez, José Sánchez Mut, Teódoro alba, Lorenzo González, "El Salero", Manuel Vázquez que junto con Luis Valencia, Juan Vázquez, Aurelio Delgado, R. Sánchez, Delfino Ríos, "El Sihuín" y "El Talache". The last two came from Atlético Latino. El Nacional went on to win the 1930–1931 and 1931–1932 league titles.

In the 1933–34 season, the club managed to win the league's title for the fifth time, this time under the management of Luis Valencia, Juan Vázquez and Ramón Sánchez. The roster included Francisco y Enrique Múñoz, Antonio Rodríguez, Juan Salcido, J. Jesús Ruelas, Hermilo Zamora, Manuel García, José Luna, José Guzmán, Jesús López "Moco III", Juan López "Moco II", Rosalío Morales, J. Trinidad González, Santos Sandoval with Luis Valencia as team captain.

At the end of the tournament, the club had its first international match against Chilean team Audax Italiano, who was on an off-season tour through Mexico playing with top clubs in the country's capital. Audax Italiano also played matches against Club Latino and Guadalajara. The match took place in April 1933 with a cup donated by Alfonso Rosales and José María Martínez, the owners of Club Nacional. The match finished with a 2–2 draw. In a friendly gesture, they decided to split the cup in two, an agreement that Audax Italiano did not initially agree with.

The club ended the 1930s by winning their sixth and seventh league titles in 1937–1938 and 1939–1940, and finished second in the 1935–1936 tournament. This gave them five league titles and various friendly cups in the 1930s.

1940s 
The club started the decade by finishing as the runners-up in 1940–1941. With President Manuel P. Carrillo, the club was invited to play in the Liga Amateur Del Distrito Federal, Mexico City's top football league at the time. The league decided to get the best players from the local league and let them play for Selección Jalisco, which would represent all clubs from Jalisco in Mexico City until 1942–1943, when the country organized their first professional league. With the professionalization of football in Mexico, the Jalisco league lost important clubs.

In 1945, Alfonso Rosales, José T. Meza and Mateo Zepeda took over the then-dismantled club that had many of their top players leaving to join clubs that offered them more money. Club Deportivo Nacional was purchased along with a group of reduced collaborators, José Ramírez being the most important.

From 1946 to 1951, Daniel Jaime and his sons took ownership and tried hard to promote it and place it in the best leagues in Mexico. The club kept producing good players, such as Jesús "Chuco" Ponce and Tomás Balcázar, standouts who later went on to be part of the Campeonísimo with C.D. Guadalajara in the 1960s.

1950s 
From 1951 to 1954, Antonio Casilla was the club's owner and saw it struggle during his ownership. In 1954, he sold the club to J. Guadalupe Vargas, who went on to register the club in the Segunda División Profesional, finally putting them in the professional leagues in Mexico. The club made it official on 26 February 1956 and played in their first tournament later in the year.

The club's first game was played on 18 July 1956, against Club Celaya, who defeated them 2–1. El Nacional did not win a single match until the third round when the beat Club de Fútbol Laguna 4–3. It played in the second division from 1956 to 1961 when the club won the championship and was awarded a promotion to the first division.

1960s Primera División de México 
The club played its first Primera División de México tournament in the 1960–1961 season. It finished with seven wins, nine draws, ten losses, and thirty scored goals and from an allowed 44. This gave them 23 points. The team was tied for eighth with Jaibos Tampico and Atlante F.C. That same year Club Universidad Nacional was promoted and CD Zacatepec was relegated to the second division.

In the 1962–1963 tournament, the club finished sixth overall with nine wins, nine draws, eight losses, scoring 37 goals from an allowed 43. This put them nine points shy of their crosstown rival CD Oro, who finished with 37 points. That same year, CD Zacatepec was promoted after a year in the inferior division and Jaibos Tampico was relegated to the second division.

In the 1963–1964 tournament, the club finished last in the league with four wins, four draws, 18 losses, totaling 12 points. They scored 26 goals from allowed 71. The club had the worst goal differential in the league after allowing 45 more goals than they scored. Cruz Azul (Jasso), the Little White Bunnys (2nd Division Champion) and Veracruz Red Sharks (2nd place in a promotion tournament) were promoted, which increased the number of teams to 16, in which Nacional was first, and thus not relegated.

In the 1964–1965 tournament, the club finished 14th, last in the league with a record of six wins, ten draws, 14 losses, and scored 29 goals from an allowed 50, for a total of 22 points. El Nacional started the tournament by losing against Club América 2–1 then losing 3–0 to Club León in the third round. They lost 2–1 to Atletico Morelia, in the fourth, lost 2–0 to C.F. Monterrey, in the 5th round and lost again to Deportivo Toluca F.C. 2–0. In the sixth round, the club was humiliated after losing 6–1 to CD Oro and, as if that was not enough, in round 7 the club lost 5–1 to Club Universidad Nacional. In the round 8 the club finally earned their first point after drawing 0–0 with Necaxa. The club was relegated to the second division that year, the club's last season in the Primera División de México to date.

Primera División de México statistics 

 Gp – Games Played
 W – Wins
 D – Draws
 L – Loss
 GF – Goals For
 GA – Goals Allowed
 Pts – Points
 DIF – Difference

Present day 
The club has participated on and off the pitch in the Mexican second and third divisions. Its squad is mostly made up of young players trying to bring the club back to its former glory. It also has a female football club that plays in the city of Guadalajara.

Honors

Amateur 
Liga Occidental De Jalisco (7) 1925–1926, 1926–1927, 1930–1931, 1931–1932, 1933–1934, 1936–1937, 1938–1939

Professional era 
 Segunda División de México: 1960–1961
 Copa México de Segunda División de México 1958
 Campeón de Campeones de Segunda División de México 1958

Other titles 
 Liga Interzona No. 16: 1958–1959, 1961–1962
 Copa Leguer Lizaldi: 1961, 1962

See also 
 Segunda División de México
 C. D. Guadalajara
 Primera División de México
 Tercera División de México

Footnotes 

1916 establishments in Mexico
Association football clubs established in 1916
Football clubs in Guadalajara, Jalisco